Kuaishou is a Chinese short video sharing platform.

Variety/live streaming

Short drama

Vertical

Movie 

Lists of television series by streaming service